Wayman Hill is a mountain in Schoharie County, New York. It is located south-southeast of Charlotteville. Meade Hill is located northeast of Wayman Hill.

References

Mountains of Schoharie County, New York
Mountains of New York (state)